Lillo of the Sulu Seas is a 1916 American silent short romance film written and directed by Thomas Ricketts. The film stars Harold Lockwood and May Allison.

Cast
 Harold Lockwood as Ralph Holt
 May Allison as Lillo
 William Stowell as Jeb Foster
 Perry Banks as Pahui
 Harry von Meter as Captain Rand

External links

1916 films
1916 romantic drama films
American silent short films
American black-and-white films
American romantic drama films
1916 short films
Films directed by Tom Ricketts
1910s American films
Silent romantic drama films
Silent American drama films